The Hanover Street Bridge – officially, the Vietnam Veterans Memorial Bridge – is a bascule bridge crossing the middle branch of the Patapsco River along Hanover Street (Maryland Route 2) in Baltimore, Maryland.

The bridge was built to replace the mile-long "Long Bridge" built by Richard Cromwell in 1856 to move products from his orchard in Anne Arundel County to downtown Baltimore.

The Hanover Street Bridge connects the southern base of the industrialized South Baltimore to the neighborhood of Cherry Hill and Brooklyn. The bridge carries five lanes of traffic: two northbound, two southbound, and one reversible. It employs a lane control system and carries two sidewalks on either side.

Designed by J. E. Greiner Company, the bridge was constructed in 1916 and is characterized as a Beaux Arts-style reinforced cantilever bridge. It is known for its beautiful arches as it spans the water. In the center of the bridge is a drawbridge span surrounded on four corners by classic style towers which lend it a distinctive appearance.

On May 30, 1993, Baltimore Mayor Kurt Schmoke officially renamed the bridge the "Vietnam Veterans Memorial Bridge".

In the 1990s, the area under the bridge became the site of a rough and sometimes murderously violent "tent city" campsite for the homeless.

, the bridge is in a state of disrepair, riddled with numerous potholes – some exposing the rebar below.

See also
 Joe Metheny

Notes

Bascule bridges in the United States
Beaux-Arts architecture in Maryland
Bridges completed in 1916
Cantilever bridges in the United States
Crossings of the Patapsco River
Monuments and memorials in Maryland
Road bridges in Maryland
Vietnam War monuments and memorials in the United States